Casus belli is a Latin expression meaning "An act or event that provokes or is used to justify war".

Casus Belli may also refer to:

 Casus Belli (Jericho episode), an episode of the American television series Jericho
 Casus Belli (magazine), a French roleplaying magazine
 Casus Belli (Homeland), an episode of the American television series Homeland

See also
Acts of war (disambiguation)